Wellpinit is an unincorporated community in Stevens County, Washington, United States. Wellpinit has a post office with ZIP code 99040. It is the setting of the young adult novel, The Absolutely True Diary of a Part-Time Indian by Sherman Alexie. The population of the ZIP Code Tabulation Area for 99040 was 930 at the 2000 census.

The community is located on the Spokane Indian Reservation.

Notable residents

Sherman Alexie - Native American author (grew up here)

References

Unincorporated communities in Stevens County, Washington
Unincorporated communities in Washington (state)